Heshi  is a town of Luojiang District, Quanzhou, Fujian province, China. , it has 21 villages under its administration.

See also

List of township-level divisions of Fujian

References

Township-level divisions of Fujian